Orthogonia plumbinotata is a moth of the family Noctuidae. It is found in China.

Xyleninae